The 2013 Women's EuroHockey Nations Championship was the 11th edition of the women's field hockey championship organised by the European Hockey Federation. It was held from 17 August to 24 August 2013 in Boom, Belgium.

Germany defeated England in the final to win their second title.

Qualified teams

Format 
The eight teams were split into two groups of four teams. The top two teams advanced to the semifinals to determine the winner in a knockout system. The bottom two teams played in a new group against the teams they did not play in the group stage. The last two teams were relegated to the EuroHockey Nations Challenge.

Squads

Results 
The match schedule was released on 24 January 2013.

All times are local (UTC+2).

Preliminary round

Pool A

Pool B

Fifth to eighth place classification

Pool C

First to fourth place classification

Semifinals

Third and fourth place

Final

Awards

Statistics

Final standings

Goalscorers

References

External links 
 

 
Women's EuroHockey Nations Championship
EuroHockey Championship
EuroHockey Championship
International women's field hockey competitions hosted by Belgium
Sport in Boom, Belgium
EuroHockey Championship
Women 1
EuroHockey Championship